Nitza Saul (born June 25, 1950, sometimes credited as Nitza Shaul) is an Israeli actress known for her appearances on British television during the 1980s.

In the 1970s Saul starred in several Israeli films, including Giv'at Halfon Eina Ona (Halfon Hill does not Answer), Hashoter Azulai (Officer Azulai) and Hagiga B'Snuker (Party at the Snooker Hall). Saul became the first Israeli woman to pose for Playboy magazine in the May 1979 issue.

After moving to London, she starred in the thriller mini-series Kessler and appeared in the Doctor Who serial "Warriors of the Deep". She also appeared in C.A.T.S. Eyes, Star Cops and EastEnders.

She subsequently returned to Israel, where she resumed her acting career, appearing on television in soap operas such as Ramat Aviv Gimmel and Florentin. In 2001 she created, wrote and edited a children's play called Sound of Magic which she continues to perform.

External links
 

1950 births
Living people
Israeli Jews
Israeli television actresses
Israeli film actresses
Israeli people of Hungarian-Jewish descent
Israeli people of Bosnia and Herzegovina-Jewish descent
Israeli expatriates in England
Actresses from Tel Aviv